Robert Anthony John Hewitt (born 12 January 1940) is a former professional tennis player from Australia. In 1967, after marrying a South African, he became a South African citizen. He has won 15 major titles and a career Grand Slam in both men's and mixed doubles.

In 2015, he was convicted of rape and sexual assault of girls he was coaching in the 1980s and 1990s; Hewitt was sentenced to six years in jail, and was subsequently expelled from the International Tennis Hall of Fame.

Early life
Hewitt was born and grew up in Dubbo, Australia, 400 kilometres west of Sydney. In the 1970s, he and his South African wife Dalaille (née Nicholas) moved to Johannesburg, South Africa. He is now a South African citizen.

Career
Hewitt's most significant accomplishment was winning all Grand Slam doubles titles, both in men's and mixed doubles (US Open, Wimbledon, Australian Open and French Open), and being central to South Africa's only Davis Cup title in 1974. This victory was controversial, as India boycotted the final on the orders of their government due to South Africa's apartheid policies and their effect on the ethnic Indian community of the country.

Hewitt achieved seven titles in singles and 65 in doubles. He was ranked world No. 6 in 1967 by Lance Tingay of The Daily Telegraph. In 1992, he was inducted into the International Tennis Hall of Fame, but he was suspended from the Hall in 2012 and expelled in 2016 after his convictions of rape and sexual assault.

Grand Slam doubles finals

Doubles (9 titles, 4 runner-ups)

Mixed doubles (6 titles, 1 runner-up)

Open-era doubles finals

Wins (54)

Allegations and conviction of sexual assault and rape 

In 2011, a six-month investigation by The Boston Globe disclosed allegations from one adult woman who was coached as a girl by Hewitt's assistant coach.
The investigation was prompted by the revelations of a former student in March 2011, who claimed that, beginning in the 1970s, Hewitt abused or harassed her when she was as young as 10 years old. Interviews with contemporaries in the United States and South Africa indicated that there had been no rumors about misconduct by Hewitt at the time of the alleged events. The South African Tennis Union investigated after 1992, but no legal action was taken against Hewitt.

The Boston Globes investigation and report of the victim prompted the request and was followed up by a letter signed by his alleged victim asking for his removal from the Hall of Fame. A November 2011 investigative piece by Mary Carillo of HBO's Real Sports with Bryant Gumbel includes interviews with the alleged victim and others who claim that Hewitt abused them. Hewitt did not agree to be interviewed for the piece.

In May 2012, Hewitt's one-time mixed doubles partner Billie Jean King spoke to the Washingtonian, saying "I don't feel good about Bob Hewitt. I played mixed with him. We won the French Open together in 1970. I'm not happy. I am very upset." On 15 November 2012, after months of investigation, Hewitt lost his place in the International Tennis Hall of Fame: "His legacy ceases to exist in the Hall of Fame", said Mark Stenning, executive director of the International Tennis Hall of Fame. "As of today, his plaque will be removed from the Hall of Fame. His name will be removed from our website and all other materials, and from the perspective of the Hall of Fame, he is suspended from the Hall of Fame." On 6 April 2016, Hewitt was officially expelled from the Tennis Hall of Fame.

Conviction 
Hewitt was charged in June 2014 with rape of two underage students in the 1980s and 1990s, and went on trial in 2015. On 23 March 2015, Hewitt was found guilty of two counts of rape and one of sexual assault of minors by the South Gauteng High Court in South Africa, and was sentenced in May to an effective six years in jail. One of his victims was 13 in 1980 when Hewitt, who was her tennis coach, raped her. Heather Crowe Conner of West Newbury was a 14-year-old in 1975 when Hewitt began raping her. Another victim was 12 in 1982 when Hewitt assaulted her during a tennis lesson.

Hewitt was released on parole in April 2020. At the time Hewitt had served three years, six months and 22 days of his six-year sentence.

References

Reference bibliography

External links 
 
 
 
 Daily Liberal – City served him well
 Real Sports 

1940 births
Living people
20th-century Australian criminals
Australian Championships (tennis) champions
Australian emigrants to South Africa
Australian male tennis players
Criminals from New South Wales
French Open champions
Grand Slam (tennis) champions in men's doubles
Grand Slam (tennis) champions in mixed doubles
Naturalised citizens of South Africa
Australian rapists
Australian people convicted of rape
Australian people convicted of child sexual abuse
People from Dubbo
Prisoners and detainees of South Africa
South African male tennis players
South African people of Australian descent
South African people of British descent
South African people convicted of rape
Child sexual abuse in South Africa
Tennis people from New South Wales
US Open (tennis) champions
Wimbledon champions
Wimbledon champions (pre-Open Era)
South African tennis coaches
White South African people
Grand Slam (tennis) champions in boys' doubles
Australian Championships (tennis) junior champions
Sportspeople convicted of crimes
ATP number 1 ranked doubles tennis players